The 50th Primetime Emmy Awards were held on Sunday, September 13, 1998. It was broadcast on NBC.

When Frasier was announced as the winner of Outstanding Comedy Series, Emmy history was made. The NBC sitcom became the first show to win one of the two main series prizes five consecutive years. This record has since been passed by The Daily Show with Jon Stewart, whose winning streak was ten years, but for the main two genres, it was not matched until 2014, when the ABC sitcom Modern Family won its fifth consecutive award for Outstanding Comedy Series.

The Practice won Outstanding Drama Series and tied for the most major wins overall with three. For the second straight year, medical drama ER came into the night as the most nominated program, but once again walked away empty handed, going 0/9 in major categories.

Ally McBeal became the first hour-long series to be nominated for Outstanding Comedy Series since Love, American Style in 1971.

This year saw the Emmys move to a new venue, the Shrine Auditorium, marking the return of the award ceremony to Los Angeles for the first time since the 1976 Emmy Awards, following a 20-year residency at the Pasadena Civic Auditorium outside L.A. in Pasadena.

As of the 2020 Emmy Awards ceremony, this is the last year where all the nominees for Outstanding Drama Series were from the broadcast networks.

Winners and nominees

Programs

Acting

Lead performances

Supporting performances

Guest performances

Directing

Writing

Most major nominations
By network 
 NBC – 49
 HBO – 29
 ABC – 25
 CBS – 19
 Fox – 13

By program
 ER (NBC) – 9
 NYPD Blue (ABC) – 8
 The Larry Sanders Show (HBO) / The X-Files (Fox) – 7
 3rd Rock from the Sun (NBC) / Frasier (NBC) / Mad About You (NBC) / Merlin (NBC) – 6

Most major awards
By network 
 ABC – 9
 NBC – 7
 HBO – 7
 CBS – 5
 TNT – 2

By program
 Frasier (NBC) / George Wallace (TNT) / NYPD Blue (ABC) / The Practice (ABC) – 3
 Don King: Only in America (HBO) / The Larry Sanders Show (HBO) / Mad About You (NBC) – 2

Notes

In Memoriam
Patrick Stewart presented a clip tribute to the TV actors who had died: Red Skelton, Shari Lewis, Lloyd Bridges, Roy Rogers, singer John Denver, Robert Young, dancer Jerome Robbins, sports narrator Harry Caray, Frank Sinatra, singer Buffalo Bob, E. G. Marshall, J. T. Walsh, Sonny Bono, Phil Hartman, and Chris Farley. As an interesting note, Gary Sinise won the award  for Outstanding Lead Actor in a Miniseries or Movie for his portrayal of George Wallace on the day that the latter died.

References

External links
 Emmys.com list of 1998 Nominees & Winners
 

050
Primetime Emmy Awards
1998 in Los Angeles
September 1998 events in the United States